James Charles Lehrer (May 19, 1934 – January 23, 2020) was an American journalist, novelist, screenwriter, and playwright. Lehrer was the executive editor and a news anchor for the PBS NewsHour on PBS and was known for his role as a debate moderator during U.S. presidential election campaigns, moderating twelve presidential debates between 1988 and 2012. He authored numerous fiction and non-fiction books that drew upon his experience as a newsman, along with his interests in history and politics.

Early life and education
James Charles Lehrer was born on May 19, 1934, in Wichita, Kansas. His mother, Lois Catherine, was a teacher and bank clerk, and his father, Harry Frederick Lehrer, was a bus station manager. His paternal grandparents were German immigrants. His maternal grandfather was J. B. Chapman, a prominent Church of the Nazarene figure. Jim had an older brother, Fred, who was a Baptist minister. He attended school in Wichita, middle school in Beaumont, Texas, and graduated from Thomas Jefferson High School in San Antonio, where he was a sports editor for the Jefferson Declaration. He graduated with an associate degree from Victoria College, and a bachelor's degree in journalism from the Missouri School of Journalism at the University of Missouri in 1956.

After graduating from college, Lehrer followed his father and older brother, and joined the United States Marine Corps serving for three years as an infantry officer in the late 1950s. He attributed his service and travels with helping him to look beyond himself and feel a connection to the world that he would not have otherwise experienced.

Career 
In 1959, Lehrer began his career in journalism at The Dallas Morning News in Texas. Later, he worked as a reporter for the Dallas Times Herald, where he covered the assassination of John F. Kennedy in 1963. He was a political columnist there for several years, and in 1968 he became the city editor.

Lehrer began his television career at KERA-TV in Dallas, Texas, as the executive director of Public Affairs, an on-air host, and editor of a nightly news program. In 1972, he moved to PBS in Washington, D.C., to become the Public Affairs Coordinator, a member of Journalism Advisory Board, and a Fellow at the Corporation for Public Broadcasting (CPB). He worked as a correspondent for the National Public Affairs Center for Television (NPACT), where he met Robert MacNeil. In 1973, they covered the Senate Watergate hearings and the revelation of the Watergate Tapes broadcast, live on PBS (This coverage of the hearings would later help lead to and be the inspiration for what would eventually become The MacNeil/Lehrer Report). Lehrer covered the House Judiciary Committee's impeachment inquiry of President Richard Nixon.

In October 1975, Lehrer became the Washington correspondent for The Robert MacNeil Report on Thirteen/WNET New York. Two months later on December 1, 1975, he was promoted to co-anchor, and the program was accordingly renamed The MacNeil/Lehrer Report. In September 1983, Lehrer and MacNeil relaunched their show as The MacNeil/Lehrer NewsHour, which was renamed The NewsHour with Jim Lehrer, following MacNeil's departure in 1995. The program was renamed the PBS NewsHour in 2009.

In order to maintain objectivity, Lehrer chose not to vote.

Lehrer underwent a heart valve surgery in April 2008, allowing Ray Suarez, Gwen Ifill, and Judy Woodruff to anchor in their stead until Lehrer's return on June 26, 2008. He had recovered from a minor heart attack in 1983 when he was 49 years old.

Lehrer stepped down as anchor of the PBS NewsHour on June 6, 2011, but continued to moderate the Friday news analysis segments and be involved with the show's production company, MacNeil/Lehrer Productions.

Lehrer received several awards and honors during his career in journalism, including several Emmys; the George Foster Peabody Broadcast Award; a William Allen White Foundation Award for Journalistic Merit; and the University of Missouri School of Journalism's Medal of Honor. In 2004, he was awarded an honorary Doctor of Journalism degree by McDaniel College.

Presidential debate moderator 
Lehrer was involved in several projects related to U.S. presidential debates, including the Debating Our Destiny documentaries in 2000 and 2008, which feature excerpts of exclusive interviews with many of the presidential and vice-presidential candidates since 1976. Nicknamed "The Dean of Moderators" by journalist Bernard Shaw, Lehrer moderated twelve presidential debates between 1988 and 2012. In 2016, Lehrer served on the board of the Commission on Presidential Debates (CPD).

The last debate that Lehrer moderated was the first general election debate of the 2012 election. He had originally sworn off moderating any debates after 2008; however, the CPD persisted, and he accepted as he was interested in the new format. The debate was held at the University of Denver and covered domestic policy issues. Lehrer's performance as a moderator, in which he frequently allowed the candidates to exceed the given time limits, received mixed reviews; while he received criticism for his lenient enforcement of time rules and open-ended questions, his approach also received praise for letting the candidates have some control in the debate on their own terms.

Personal life 

For six decades until his death, Lehrer was married to Kate Lehrer, who is also a novelist. They had three daughters and six grandchildren. His father was a bus driver who briefly operated a bus company. Lehrer was an avid bus enthusiast, a hobbyist, and a collector of bus memorabilia, including depot signs, driver caps, and antique toy buses. As a college student in the 1950s, he worked as a Trailways ticket agent in Victoria, Texas. He also was a supporter of the Pacific Bus Museum in Williams, California, and the Museum of Bus Transportation in Hershey, Pennsylvania.

Lehrer was a prolific writer and authored numerous novels, as well as several plays, screenplays, and three personal memoirs. His book, Top Down, is a novel based on the events surrounding the Kennedy assassination. His last play, Bell, was produced by the National Geographic Society as part of their 125th anniversary celebration.

Death 
On January 23, 2020, Lehrer died from a heart attack at his home in Washington, D.C., at the age of 85.

Honors and awards 

 Paul White Award, Radio Television Digital News Association (1990)
 Golden Plate Award of the American Academy of Achievement (1990)
 American Academy of Arts and Sciences member (elected in 1991)
 University of Missouri School of Journalism's Medal of Honor
 William Allen White Foundation Award for Journalistic Merit
 Peabody Award
 Fred Friendly First Amendment Award
 Two Emmy Awards
 Silver Circle of the Washington, D.C., chapter of the National Academy of Television Arts and Sciences (1999)
 Television Hall of Fame (1999)
 National Humanities Medal (1999)
 Walter Cronkite Award for Excellence in Journalism (2008)

Bibliography

Novels

Memoirs

Screenplays 
 An adaptation of White Widow has been written by Luke Wilson
 Viva Max! (1969) writing credit with Elliott Baker
 The Last Debate (2000) writing credit with Jon Maas

Plays 
 The Will and Bart Show
 Church Key Charlie Blue
 Chili Queen
 Bell

References

Further reading 
Art at Our Doorstep: San Antonio Writers and Artists featuring Jim Lehrer. Edited by Nan Cuba and Riley Robinson (Trinity University Press, 2008).

External links 

 
 Remembering Jim Lehrer - PBS
 
 
 
 
 Jim Lehrer on InnerVIEWS with Ernie Manouse

1934 births
2020 deaths
20th-century American journalists
American male journalists
20th-century American male writers
20th-century American non-fiction writers
20th-century American novelists
21st-century American journalists
21st-century American male writers
21st-century American non-fiction writers
21st-century American novelists
American male non-fiction writers
American male novelists
American people of German descent
American television news anchors
Emmy Award winners
Jefferson High School (San Antonio, Texas) alumni
Journalists from Texas
Military personnel from Texas
Missouri School of Journalism alumni
National Humanities Medal recipients
Novelists from Texas
PBS people
People from Beaumont, Texas
The Dallas Morning News people
United States Marine Corps officers
Writers from Dallas
Writers from San Antonio
Writers from Wichita, Kansas